20th Land of Krakow Infantry Regiment (Polish language: 20 Pulk Piechoty Ziemi Krakowskiej, 20 pp) was an infantry regiment of the Polish Army. It existed from late 1918 until September 1939. Garrisoned in Krakow, the unit belonged to the 6th Infantry Division from Krakow. During the 1939 Invasion of Poland, the regiment, together with its division, belonged to Krakow Army.

The history of the regiment dates back to early November 1918, when a group of ethnic Polish soldiers of the former Austro-Hungarian 16th Rifle Regiment came from Opava to Krakow. After additional battalions arrived at Krakow, formation of the Land of Krakow Infantry Regiment began in early 1919. On April 4, the new unit was named the 20th Land of Krakow Infantry Regiment, and was incorporated into the 6th Infantry Division.

The flag of the regiment was handed to it in Krakow by President Stanislaw Wojciechowski, on May 18, 1924. It was funded by the residents of Krakow and nearby towns. In September 1939, the flag was taken to Romania, and then to England. It is now kept at the Polish Institute of General Sikorski in London.

Sources 
 Kazimierz Satora: Opowieści wrześniowych sztandarów. Warszawa: Instytut Wydawniczy Pax, 1990
 Zdzisław Jagiełło: Piechota Wojska Polskiego 1918–1939. Warszawa: Bellona, 2007

See also 
 1939 Infantry Regiment (Poland)

Infantry regiments of Poland
Military units and formations established in 1918
Military units and formations disestablished in 1939
Military units and formations of Poland in World War II
Polish Legions in World War I